Jean-Pierre Maïone-Libaude was a French veteran of the Algerian War (1954–62), former member of the OAS' Commando Delta, a nationalist terrorist group. He then became the informant of police officer Lucien Aimé-Blanc, former vice chief of staff of the Antigang brigade and of the Narcotics brigade. Jean-Pierre "Maïon" was assassinated on 13 June 1982 at Argent-sur-Sauldre, in the Cher province, soon after being free from prison. In 2006, Lucien Aimé-Blanc revealed that Maïon had acknowledged having assassinated Pierre Goldman in 1979 on behalf of the GAL Spanish death squad. Aimé-Blanc also stated that he may have been responsible for the assassination of Henri Curiel in 1978.

Sources 

Lucien Aimé-Blanc and Jean-Michel Caradec'h, L'Indic et le Commissaire, Plon, 2006, 246 pages 
Pierre Goldman, Le frère de l'ombre, Seuil, 2005, 298 p.

See also 

List of assassinated people
Organisation armée secrète
Algerian War of Independence (1954-62)
Grupos Antiterroristas de Liberación death squad

20th-century French criminals
Members of the Organisation armée secrète
1982 deaths
People murdered in France
Year of birth missing